Ditte may refer to:

First names 
 Ditte Ejlerskov (born 1982), Danish contemporary artist
 Ditte Gråbøl (born 1959), Danish actress
 Ditte Jensen (born 1980), Danish freestyle swimmer
 Ditte Kotzian (born 1979), German diver
 Ditte Larsen (born 1983), Danish footballer
 Ditte Søby Hansen (born 1997), Danish badminton player

Other uses 
 Ditte, Child of Man a 1946 Danish feature film adaptation of a novel by Martin Andersen Nexø
 3535 Ditte, a main-belt asteroid, named after the protagonist of Ditte, Child of Man
 Mount Ditte, located on the Adelaide Island off the west coast of the Antarctic Peninsula

See also 
 Friedrich Dittes (1829–1896) a German-Austrian educator

Feminine given names